Louise Jordan (January 3, 1908 – November 22, 1966) was an American petroleum geologist. She received an honorary membership to the Oklahoma City Geological Society for her extensive subsurface research in the state of Oklahoma.

Early life and education 

Louise Jordan was born on January 3, 1908, in the city of Joplin, Missouri, to Fred A. and Anna Jordan. She attended Port Henry High School in New York, and later continued her education at Wellesley College to achieve a Bachelor of Arts degree in geology and chemistry. Jordan's interest in geology originated from her father, due to his career as a mining engineer revolving around the field of geology. She  received a master's degree in Micro-Paleontology at M.I.T. 1931  Upon completion of her master's degree she taught physics at the American College for Girls in Istanbul, Turkey, before returning to M.I.T. in 1933 to begin work on her doctoral dissertation entitled "A Study of Miocene Foraminifera from Jamaica, the Dominican Republic, and the Republics of Panama, Costa Rica and Haiti" which she completed in 1939. During completion of her Doctorate of Philosophy she returned to Ankara, Turkey to work as a stratigrapher and micropaleontologist for the Turkish government from 1935-1938. Afterwards she returned to Texas.

Career 
While pursuing her doctorate, Jordan taught part-time at Mount Holyoke College. Jordan later pursued stratigraphy in the petroleum field. Within her Micro-paleontology degree she looked at foraminifera which was a popular field for women during that era. Post teaching, her work took her back to Istanbul to work in the field of mineral research but later coming back to the US to work for Anzac Oil & Gas Inc. in Coleman, Texas from 1938-1941. In 1941 she moved between to Dallas and Amarillo in Texas and Tallahassee, Florida to work for the Sun Oil Company (now Sunoco) until 1950. From 1950-1951, she worked as a geological consultant for the Florida Geological Survey. In 1955, she moved to Oklahoma to work at the Oklahoma Geological Survey. Jordan served as member of various professional geological societies in editorial positions and as chairman. Most notably, in 1964, she was a founding member of the Chinar Circle, a group of 35 geologist from 23 different countries. Jordan's work made her an integral part of the geological community on a local, national and international level. Her work in the petroleum field took her to the University of Oklahoma where she resided until she died in 1966 after authoring over 80 publications in reference mainly to basic geological information for the petroleum industry in Oklahoma.

Legacy 
Jordan died on November 22, 1966, in Norman, Oklahoma, after a long battle with a disease. The impression she left on her friends and family inspired Jordan's brother, Allen E. Jordan and friends to create the "Dr. Louise Jordan Memorial Fund". Allen donated a portion of Louise's estate into the fund designed help graduate students continue their education and research in geology at the University of Oklahoma.

References 

1908 births
1966 deaths
American women geologists
American petroleum geologists
People from Joplin, Missouri
Academics from Oklahoma
Wellesley College alumni
Massachusetts Institute of Technology alumni
Mount Holyoke College faculty
Place of death missing
20th-century American women
20th-century American people
American women academics